The Year of Magical Thinking (2005), by Joan Didion (1934–2021), is an account of the year following the death of the author's husband John Gregory Dunne (1932–2003). Published by Knopf in October 2005, The Year of Magical Thinking was immediately acclaimed as a classic book about mourning. It won the 2005 National Book Award for Nonfiction
and was a finalist for both the National Book Critics Circle Award and the Pulitzer Prize for Biography or Autobiography.

Structure and themes 

The book recounts Didion's experiences of grief after Dunne's 2003 death. Days before his death, their daughter Quintana Roo Dunne Michael was hospitalized in New York with pneumonia which developed into septic shock; she was still unconscious when her father died. During 2004 Quintana was again hospitalized after she fell and hit her head disembarking from a plane at LAX. 
She had returned to Malibu, her childhood home, after learning of her father's death.

The book follows Didion's reliving and reanalysis of her husband's death throughout the year following it, in addition to caring for Quintana. With each replay of the event, the focus on certain emotional and physical aspects of the experience shifts. Didion also incorporates medical and psychological research on grief and illness into the book.

The title of the book refers to magical thinking in the anthropological sense, thinking that if a person hopes for something enough or performs the right actions then an unavoidable event can be averted. Didion reports many instances of her own magical thinking, particularly the story in which she cannot give away Dunne's shoes, as he would need them when he returned. The experience of insanity or derangement that is part of grief is a major theme, about which Didion was unable to find a great deal of existing literature.

Didion applies the reportorial detachment for which she is known to her own experience of grieving; there are few expressions of raw emotion. Through observation and analysis of changes in her own behavior and abilities, she indirectly expresses the toll her grief is taking. She is haunted by questions about the medical details of her husband's death, the possibility that he sensed it in advance, and how she might have made his remaining time more meaningful. Fleeting memories of events and persistent snippets of past conversations with John take on a new significance. Her daughter's continuing health problems and hospitalizations further compound and interrupt the natural course of grief.

Writing process 

Didion wrote The Year of Magical Thinking between October 4 and December 31, 2004, completing it a year and a day after Dunne died. Notes she made during Quintana's hospitalizations became part of the book. Quintana Roo Dunne Michael died of pancreatitis on August 26, 2005, before the book's publication, but Didion did not revise the manuscript. Instead she devoted a second book, Blue Nights, to her daughter's death.

Reception
The New York Times Book Review praised the memoir as "not a downer. On the contrary. Though the material is literally terrible, the writing is exhilarating and what unfolds resembles an adventure narrative."
The New York Review of Books declared, "I can't imagine dying without this book." The American Prospect's mixed review found that the book read "like a Warren Report on the death of LBJ." In 2019, the book was ranked 40th on The Guardian'''s list of the 100 best books of the 21st century.

The play

On March 29, 2007, Didion's adaptation of her book for Broadway, directed by David Hare, opened with Vanessa Redgrave as the sole cast member. The play expands upon the memoir by dealing with Quintana's death. It ran for 24 weeks at the Booth Theatre in New York City and the following year Redgrave reprised her role to largely positive reviews at London's National Theatre. This production was set to tour the world, including Salzburg, Athens, Dublin Theatre Festival, Bath and Cheltenham. The play was also performed in the Sydney Theatre Company's 2008 season, starring Robyn Nevin and directed by Cate Blanchett.

Also in 2008, it was performed in Barcelona at the Sala Beckett, directed by Òscar Molina and starring Marta Angelat. The play was performed in Canada at the Belfry Theatre in 2009 and at the Tarragon Theatre by Seana McKenna. This production was also mounted in January 2011 as part of English Theatre's season at the National Arts Centre in Ottawa.

On October 26, 2009 Redgrave reprised her performance again in a benefit production of the play at the Cathedral Church of St. John the Divine in New York City.

In January 2010, the play was mounted at the Court Theater in Chicago, starring Mary Beth Fisher. Fisher won the 2010 "Jeff" (Joseph Jefferson equity) Solo Performance Award for her performance.

The play was mounted in April 2011 by Nimbus Theater in Minneapolis, MN, starring Barbra Berlovitz and directed by Liz Neerland.  In 2011, Fanny Ardant played a French translation of The Year of Magical Thinking in Théâtre de l'Atelier, Paris.

The play opened in May 2015, at Teatro Español y Naves del Español in Madrid (Spain), produced by Teatro Guindalera. Starring Jeannine Mestre, directed by Juan Pastor Millet.  The Norwegian translation of the play premiered in September 2015 at Den Nationale Scene in Bergen, directed by Jon Ketil Johnsen and starring Rhine Skaanes. On November 3, 2017, Stageworks Theatre in Tampa, Florida, opened a production of the play featuring Vickie Daignault. Writing in the Tampa Bay Times, Colette Bancroft noted Daignault's "skill and subtlety" and the exploration of grief in Didion's play that was "raw and refined at once."

References and notes

External links
 Audio interview with Joan Didion by Kurt Anderson (2005). Studio 360''. March 2, 2007.
 Book page on the official website

Books by Joan Didion
Literary autobiographies
Plays for one performer
National Book Award for Nonfiction winning works
Alfred A. Knopf books
2005 non-fiction books
Novels about death
Books adapted into plays